The National Council for the Blind of Ireland (NCBI), in Drumcondra, Dublin, is a charitable organisation which provides support and services to people experiencing sight loss in Ireland

Established in 1931 by Alice Stanley Armitage among others to promote the full independence of people who are blind or vision impaired the NCBI now employs over 160 staff and many volunteers, providing services to more than 55,000 people.

External links 
NCBI Website

References

Disability organisations based in the Republic of Ireland
Blindness charities
Seanad nominating bodies